Japanese destroyers have been named :

  an  launched in 1899 and expended as a target in 1917
 , a  the Japanese Maritime Self-Defense Force fleet

See also 
 Sazanami (disambiguation)

Imperial Japanese Navy ship names
Japanese Navy ship names